Neve Avivim is a residential neighborhood of Tel Aviv, Israel. It is located in the northwestern part of the city.

History
Neve Avivim was founded in the 1960s, and nearly half of the existing structures were built in this decade.
Neve Avivim is home to the Israel Chess Federation.

Notable residents
 Yakir Aharonov
 Shimon Peres
 Itzhak Rabin
 Dalia Rabin-Pelossof
 Itamar Rabinovich
 Zvi Sherf

References

External links
 The Sol and Sissy Mark Chess Center, The Israel Chess Federation 
 Article on the residential construction in Neve Avivim, XNet 

Neighborhoods of Tel Aviv